Acidovorax caeni is a gram-negative, catalase- and oxidase-positive, rod-shaped bacterium from the Comamonadaceae family that was isolated from the activated sludge of a wastewater treatment plant in Belgium. Colonies are yellow–brown.

References

External links
Type strain of Acidovorax caeni at BacDive -  the Bacterial Diversity Metadatabase

Comamonadaceae
Bacteria described in 2008